Edmund Drummond may refer to:

 Edmund Drummond (born 1814), lieutenant-governor North-Western Provinces in India, and his son:
 Edmund Drummond (Royal Navy officer) (1841–1911), Royal Navy officer
 Edmund Rupert Drummond (1884–1965), Royal Navy vice-admiral